JD Sports Fashion plc, more commonly known as JD Sports, JD or JD Group is a British sports-fashion retail company based in Bury, Greater Manchester, England. It is listed on the London Stock Exchange and is a constituent of the FTSE 100 Index. Pentland Group owns 55% of the company.

History

The company was established by John Wardle and David Makin (hence the name JD), trading from a single shop in Bury, Greater Manchester, in 1981. The company opened a store in the Arndale Centre in Manchester in 1983. Pentland Group bought Wardle's and Makin's shares for £44.6M in May 2005, so acquiring 45% of the business.

Acquisitions
Early acquisitions of stores included 209 stores with the acquisition of First Sport from Blacks Leisure Group in December 2001 and 70 stores from the administrators of Allsports in October 2005. Subsequent acquisitions of businesses included:

Bank Stores, which sold fashion clothing, for around £19M in December 2007
Champion Sports for €19.6M in January 2011 
Blacks Leisure Group out of administration for £20 million in January 2012 
the streetwear clothing brand, FLY53, in February 2012
the brand Tessuti in 2016
Cloggs, a shoe retailer, out of administration, in February 2013
 part ownership of the Leeds-based trainer retailer, The Hip Store, in May 2014
Clothingsites.co.uk with its websites, Woodhouse Clothing and Brown Bag Clothing in September 2016
Go Outdoors for £112 million in November 2016
the US-based retailer, Finish Line for $558 million in March 2018
the retailer, Footasylum, for £90 million in March 2019
Shoe Palace for $325 million in December 2020

In addition, the company acquired the rugby heritage brands 'Canterbury' and 'Canterbury of New Zealand' as well as 'The Duffer of St. George' and 'Kooga Rugby' brands.

International operations
The company acquired Chausport, which operated 75 small stores in France, in May 2009. It opened its first store in Malaysia in January 2016. The company acquired an 80% stake in the Australian retailer Next Athleisure for A$6.6 million in late 2016. This was followed by the opening of more stores in Australia in April 2017, in South Korea in April 2018, in Singapore in May 2018 and in Thailand in November 2018. The company also acquired 80% of Cosmos Sport, based in Crete, in December 2021 and has launched a joint venture in Indonesia with a store opened in 2022.

Sponsorship
JD Sports is the official supplier and sponsor of association football teams, players and associations. In August 2008, JD Sports announced sponsorship deals with AFC Bournemouth, Charlton Athletic, Dundee United, Blackpool, Luton Town & Oldham Athletic.

Controversies

Mistreatment of staff
The company has been the subject of accusations of mistreatment of its UK warehouse staff, with comparisons being made to Victorian "dark satanic mills" and "prison" conditions in 2016 and 2019.

Go Outdoors
The company pushed its subsidiary, Go Outdoors, into administration in June 2020 but then bought it back from administrators with the creditors losing much of their money.

Alleged breaches of competition law
The company along with Leicester City were placed under investigation by the Competition and Markets Authority (CMA) due to alleged breaches in competition law in September 2021. The investigation was in regard to anti-competitive agreements over the sale of club branded merchandise in the UK. Both JD Sports and Leicester City said they were 'fully cooperating' with the CMA.

Covert meetings between the Chief Executive Officers of JD Sports and Footasylum
After the company acquired Footasylum in March 2019, the CMA carried out an investigation and then, on the basis that the company's ownership of Footasylum might limit competition, ordered the company to dispose of Footasylum. The company and, its subsidiary, Footasylum, were fined a combined £4.7 million after the CEO of JD Sports, Peter Cowgill, allegedly met covertly with the CEO of Footasylum, Barry Bown, on two occasions in July and August 2021 in breach of an order from the CMA not to exchange commercially sensitive information without CMA consent. One of the meetings was alleged to have taken place in a car park in Bury, Greater Manchester.

References

External links

 

1981 establishments in England
Sportswear brands
Clothing retailers of England
Clothing companies of England
Retail companies established in 1981
Companies based in Bury, Greater Manchester
British companies established in 1981
Sporting goods retailers of the United Kingdom
Companies listed on the London Stock Exchange
English brands
1996 initial public offerings